Lumon arena is an ice hockey arena located in Kouvola, Finland. The arena has a seating capacity of about 5,950. The arena's official public record is from the 1985, I-Divisioona match KooKoo against SaiPa, followed by 5350 spectators. The name of the Kouvolan jäähalli changed in 2015 as a continuation of the arena when KooKoo and Lumon entered into a co-operation agreement.

Sports

Lumon Arena is the home venue of the ice hockey team KooKoo.

The arena has also been used for part of the IIHF European Junior Championships in 1987, there has also played a single Euro Hockey Tour match in 2016, where Finland and Czech Republic national teams were confronted. The match ended with Finland's 4–1 victory. 
There was also The Kouvot won the Finnish Basketball Championship in 2016.

Including the 1997 European Wrestling Championships was held in there.

In 2018 the Finnish Figure Skating Championships was held in for the first time in Lumon arena.

In 2019,There was be a single Euro Hockey Challenge/Nordic Cup match between Finland and Sweden and match ended with Finland's 5–4 victory.

See also
List of indoor arenas in Finland
List of indoor arenas in Nordic countries

References

Indoor arenas in Finland
Indoor ice hockey venues in Finland